High Tech High North County, also known as HTHNC, is a charter school located in San Marcos, California. It is a part of the High Tech High organization. Opening in 2007, with its initial class consisting of only 150 freshmen, the school has since expanded, with more than five hundred and fifty students attending. Each year, there had been a new class added. In the 2008-2009 school year, it was sophomores, in the 2009-2010 school year it was juniors, and in the 2010-2011 school year it became seniors. It is one of only two High Tech High schools to be built from the ground up with the other being High Tech High Chula Vista. The school follows the same type of personalized, college preparatory, project-based learning characterized at other High Tech High schools.

Mission and goals
High Tech High’s mission is to develop and support innovative public schools where all students develop the academic, workplace, and citizenship skills for post-secondary success.

Serve a student body that mirrors the ethnic and socioeconomic diversity of the local community.
Integrate technical and academic education to prepare students for post-secondary education in both high tech and liberal arts fields.
Increase the number of educationally disadvantaged students in math and engineering who succeed in high school and post-secondary education.
Graduate students who will be thoughtful, engaged citizens.

Curriculum
All HTH students pursue a rigorous curriculum that provides the foundation for entry and success at the University of California and elsewhere, as well as success in the world of work. Schools articulate common expectations for learning that value 21st century skills, the integration of hands and minds, and the merging of academic disciplines. Assessment is performance-based: all students develop projects, solve problems, and present findings to community panels. All students are required to complete an academic internship, a substantial senior project, and a personal digital portfolio. Teachers employ a variety of approaches to accommodate diverse learners, and recognize the value of having students from different backgrounds working together.

Internship
All High Tech High juniors are required to complete an internship in a local organization. The internship consists of an orientation followed by a four-week, full-time immersion at the work site, concluding with the intern’s presentation of learning. High Tech High seniors are required to intern for one semester on Tuesdays and Wednesdays. Students receive credit for successfully completing their internship and related course work.

The High Tech High Internship program aims to foster personal growth and help students acquire workplace skills in a real-world environment. The program offers local organizations a well-supported intern who provides a modest return on investment.

Digital portfolios

HTHNC students are required to develop a digital portfolio (DP) that provides a comprehensive look at their work, learning and projects. Students update their digital portfolios each semester, documenting their learning over time.  In addition to student digital portfolios, teachers maintain their own DPs that have current assignments, project overviews and class exhibitions of projects.

Intersession
Intersession takes place once a year, with its purpose being to immerse students out in the community; whether locally, nationally, or internationally. Intersession programs can range from community service, to homework study, to leisurely trips to exotic destinations such as Costa Rica, New Zealand, or Brazil. Many of the programs within intersession are not limited to just a single grade or class; and the combination of students of different grades enables them to bond with other students, and teachers.

Elective
Since the High Tech High Organization does not require physical education to be taken by students, an elective is a program that is offered in substitution.
Electives range from  ultimate frisbee, to slack lining, to super support, to yoga or to robotics. Any student can put together their own, personalized elective, as long as they have a teacher to support them, and enough students to participate with them.

Results

Aside from High Tech High North County, there are several other schools that have been built that share the same values of the original HTH model:

New Bedford Global Learning Charter School, New Bedford, Massachusetts
New Urban High School, Clackamas, Oregon
Mirta Ramirez Computer Science Charter School, Chicago, Illinois
City High School, Tucson, Arizona
Explorer Elementary Charter School San Diego
High Tech High International San Diego
High Tech High Media Arts San Diego
High Tech Middle San Diego
High Tech Middle Media Arts San Diego
High Tech Los Angeles Los Angeles
High Tech High North County San Marcos, California

See also
Education in the United States

References

External links
 

Education in San Marcos, California
Charter high schools in California
High Tech High charter schools
2007 establishments in California